Kotovo is the name of several inhabited localities in Russia.

Belgorod Oblast
As of 2010, one rural locality in Belgorod Oblast bears this name:
Kotovo, Belgorod Oblast, a selo in Starooskolsky District

Chelyabinsk Oblast
As of 2010, one rural locality in Chelyabinsk Oblast bears this name:
Kotovo, Chelyabinsk Oblast, a settlement in Unkurdinsky Selsoviet of Nyazepetrovsky District

Ivanovo Oblast
As of 2010, three rural localities in Ivanovo Oblast bear this name:
Kotovo, Furmanovsky District, Ivanovo Oblast, a village in Furmanovsky District
Kotovo (Ryabovskoye Rural Settlement), Lukhsky District, Ivanovo Oblast, a village in Lukhsky District; municipally, a part of Ryabovskoye Rural Settlement of that district
Kotovo (Blagoveshchenskoye Rural Settlement), Lukhsky District, Ivanovo Oblast, a village in Lukhsky District; municipally, a part of Blagoveshchenskoye Rural Settlement of that district

Kaluga Oblast
As of 2010, one rural locality in Kaluga Oblast bears this name:
Kotovo, Kaluga Oblast, a village in Mosalsky District

Kostroma Oblast
As of 2010, two rural localities in Kostroma Oblast bear this name:
Kotovo, Kostromskoy District, Kostroma Oblast, a village in Kotovskoye Settlement of Kostromskoy District
Kotovo, Parfenyevsky District, Kostroma Oblast, a village in Parfenyevskoye Settlement of Parfenyevsky District

Kursk Oblast
As of 2010, one rural locality in Kursk Oblast bears this name:
Kotovo, Kursk Oblast, a selo in Kotovsky Selsoviet of Pristensky District

Lipetsk Oblast
As of 2010, one rural locality in Lipetsk Oblast bears this name:
Kotovo, Lipetsk Oblast, a village in Gryzlovsky Selsoviet of Dolgorukovsky District

Moscow Oblast
As of 2010, three rural localities in Moscow Oblast bear this name:
Kotovo (settlement), Luchinskoye Rural Settlement, Istrinsky District, Moscow Oblast, a settlement in Luchinskoye Rural Settlement of Istrinsky District
Kotovo (village), Luchinskoye Rural Settlement, Istrinsky District, Moscow Oblast, a village in Luchinskoye Rural Settlement of Istrinsky District
Kotovo, Naro-Fominsky District, Moscow Oblast, a village in Ateptsevskoye Rural Settlement of Naro-Fominsky District

Novgorod Oblast
As of 2010, four rural localities in Novgorod Oblast bear this name:
Kotovo, Peredskoye Settlement, Borovichsky District, Novgorod Oblast, a village in Peredskoye Settlement of Borovichsky District
Kotovo, Sushilovskoye Settlement, Borovichsky District, Novgorod Oblast, a village in Sushilovskoye Settlement of Borovichsky District
Kotovo, Lyubytinsky District, Novgorod Oblast, a village under the administrative jurisdiction of the urban-type settlement of Nebolchi, Lyubytinsky District
Kotovo, Okulovsky District, Novgorod Oblast, a settlement in Kotovskoye Settlement of Okulovsky District

Oryol Oblast
As of 2010, one rural locality in Oryol Oblast bears this name:
Kotovo, Oryol Oblast, a village in Kotovsky Selsoviet of Uritsky District

Pskov Oblast
As of 2010, seven rural localities in Pskov Oblast bear this name:
Kotovo, Bezhanitsky District, Pskov Oblast, a village in Bezhanitsky District
Kotovo, Dedovichsky District, Pskov Oblast, a village in Dedovichsky District
Kotovo, Kunyinsky District, Pskov Oblast, a village in Kunyinsky District
Kotovo, Novorzhevsky District, Pskov Oblast, a village in Novorzhevsky District
Kotovo, Opochetsky District, Pskov Oblast, a village in Opochetsky District
Kotovo, Pskovsky District, Pskov Oblast, a village in Pskovsky District
Kotovo, Pustoshkinsky District, Pskov Oblast, a village in Pustoshkinsky District

Ryazan Oblast
As of 2010, one rural locality in Ryazan Oblast bears this name:
Kotovo, Ryazan Oblast, a village in Bychkovsky Rural Okrug of Klepikovsky District

Smolensk Oblast
As of 2010, two rural localities in Smolensk Oblast bear this name:
Kotovo, Monastyrshchinsky District, Smolensk Oblast, a village in Aleksandrovskoye Rural Settlement of Monastyrshchinsky District
Kotovo, Novoduginsky District, Smolensk Oblast, a village in Novoduginskoye Rural Settlement of Novoduginsky District

Tver Oblast
As of 2010, three rural localities in Tver Oblast bear this name:
Kotovo, Belsky District, Tver Oblast, a village in Belsky District
Kotovo, Kalininsky District, Tver Oblast, a village in Kalininsky District
Kotovo, Zapadnodvinsky District, Tver Oblast, a village in Zapadnodvinsky District

Udmurt Republic
As of 2010, one rural locality in the Udmurt Republic bears this name:
Kotovo, Udmurt Republic, a village in Pinyazsky Selsoviet of Karakulinsky District

Volgograd Oblast
As of 2010, one urban locality in Volgograd Oblast bears this name:
Kotovo, Volgograd Oblast, a town in Kotovsky District; administratively incorporated as a town of district significance

Vologda Oblast
As of 2010, four rural localities in Vologda Oblast bear this name:
Kotovo, Chagodoshchensky District, Vologda Oblast, a village in Lukinsky Selsoviet of Chagodoshchensky District
Kotovo, Cherepovetsky District, Vologda Oblast, a village in Ivanovsky Selsoviet of Cherepovetsky District
Kotovo, Sheksninsky District, Vologda Oblast, a village in Lyubomirovsky Selsoviet of Sheksninsky District
Kotovo, Ustyuzhensky District, Vologda Oblast, a village in Nikiforovsky Selsoviet of Ustyuzhensky District

Yaroslavl Oblast
As of 2010, five rural localities in Yaroslavl Oblast bear this name:
Kotovo, Gavrilov-Yamsky District, Yaroslavl Oblast, a village in Kuzovkovsky Rural Okrug of Gavrilov-Yamsky District
Kotovo, Nekouzsky District, Yaroslavl Oblast, a village in Spassky Rural Okrug of Nekouzsky District
Kotovo, Poshekhonsky District, Yaroslavl Oblast, a village in Kholmovsky Rural Okrug of Poshekhonsky District
Kotovo, Uglichsky District, Yaroslavl Oblast, a village in Golovinsky Rural Okrug of Uglichsky District
Kotovo, Yaroslavsky District, Yaroslavl Oblast, a village in Kurbsky Rural Okrug of Yaroslavsky District

See also
Kotov (disambiguation)
Kotovsky (disambiguation)